Rocket Pictures is a British film company founded in 1996 by Elton John to produce family and music-themed film and TV projects.

The company was established in 1996 with a ten-year first-look deal with The Walt Disney Company, a three-year deal with Paramount Pictures and with a currently deal with STX Entertainment.

Filmography

Universal Pictures
 Elton John: Tantrums & Tiaras (1997)
 Women Talking Dirty (1999)

Icon Productions
 It's a Boy Girl Thing (2006)

The Walt Disney Company
 Gnomeo & Juliet (2011)

Paramount Pictures
 Sherlock Gnomes (2018)
 Rocketman (2019)

STX Entertainment
 Joseph and the Amazing Technicolor Dreamcoat (TBA)

Unproduced
 Will Gallows and the Snake-Bellied Troll (TBA)
 N.E.R.D.S. (TBA)

References

External links
 

Film production companies of the United Kingdom
Entertainment companies established in 1996
Elton John